Mathurin-Joseph Brisset (22 November 1792 – 7 June 1856) was a French writer, poet, political journalist and playwright of the first half of the 19th century.

Biography 
A bodyguard attached to the company of Havré, then an infantry officer during the reigns of Louis XVIII and Charles X, he took part to the Spanish campaign (1823) where he was awarded the cross of first class knight of the Order of Saint Ferdinand. He left the army after the July Revolution of 1830 and landed as political critic by the Gazette de France. He also held there theatrical criticism and devoted himself entirely to writing. Thus, he published a considerable number of historical novels and his plays were presented on the most famous Parisian stages of his time: Théâtre des Nouveautés, Théâtre du Vaudeville, Théâtre de la Porte-Saint-Martin, Gymnase dramatique etc.

Works 

1816: Les Dames du Lis, poem
1818: La Statue de Henri IV, ode
1818: La Salle des Maréchaux
1820: La Messe de délivrance
1820: Ernest
1821: Le Traité de paix, comédie-vaudeville in 1 act, with Achille d'Artois
1822: Le Départ d'une diligence, tableau épisodique in 1 act, mingled with vaudevilles, with Edmond Rochefort
1822: Honneur et séduction, melodrama in 3 acts, with Louis-Charles Caigniez
1822: Le Zodiaque de Paris, à propos du Zodiaque de Denderah, vaudeville-épisodique in 1 act, with Ferdinand Langlé
1823: Le Magasin de lumière, scènes à-propos de l'éclairage par le gaz, with Ferdinand Langlé, Ramond de la Croisette and Emmanuel Théaulon
1824: Le Retour à la ferme, comédie-vaudeville in 1 act, with Achille d'Artois
1825: Madrid, ou observations sur des mœurs et usages des Espagnols au commencement du XIXe siècle, with Théodore Anne
1825: Les Singes, ou la Parade dans le salon, vaudeville in 1 act, with Espérance Hippolyte Lassagne and Edmond Rochefort
1826: La pêche de Vulcain, ou L'île des fleuves, vaudeville, with Espérance Hippolyte Lassagne and Edmond Rochefort
1827: Le coureur de veuves, comedy in 2 acts
1827: Les Dernières amours, tableau-vaudeville in 1 act
1827: Les Rendez-vous, comédie-vaudeville
1827: Paris et Londres, Comedy in 4 tableaux, with Armand d'Artois
1828: Le Peintre et le courtisan, anecdotical comédie-vaudeville en 1 act
1828: L'Anneau de la fiancée, lyrical drama in 3 acts, with Felice Blangini
1829: Angiolina ou la Femme du doge, drama in 3 acts
1829: Les Deux Raymond, ou les Nouveaux Ménechmes, 6-chapter novel, with Victor Ducange
1835: Le Mauvais œil, tradition dalmate, suivi d'une nouvelle française
1837: Les Templiers, 1313
1838: Le Génie d'une femme
1840: François de Guise, 1563
1841: Le Balafré, 1572-1587
1843: Le cabinet de lecture
1844: Le Béarnais
1844: La Femme d'un ministre, Mme Roland. 1793
1845 Le Petit roi
1846: Madame Jean, 1846
1847: Les Concini, 1616-1617
1849: La Maréchale de Saint-André
1854: Jacquot
1854: M. de Beauregard
1854: La Maréchale de Saint-André
1859: Hugues-le-Cadavre, mystère du XIe siècle

Bibliography 
 Pierre Larousse, Grand dictionnaire universel du XIXe siècle, 1865,  
 Thomas Rossman Palfrey, L'Europe littéraire: (1833-1834), 1927, 
 Charles Maillier, Trois journalistes drouais: Brisset, Dujarier, Buré, 1968, 
 Robert Sabatier, Histoire de la poésie française: La poésie du XIXe siècle, 1975, 
 Jed Z. Buchwald, Diane Greco Josefowicz, The Zodiac of Paris: How an Improbable Controversy Over an Ancient Egyptian, 2010, 

19th-century French poets
19th-century French journalists
French male journalists
French political journalists
19th-century French dramatists and playwrights
19th-century French novelists
French librettists
Writers from Dreux
1792 births
1856 deaths
19th-century French male writers